This page lists the consular missions located in Scotland, a constituent country within the United Kingdom.
These consular posts are listed by the FCDO, which is responsible for issuing documents of identification to consular staff; the FCDO lists were last updated on 14 September 2021.

Consulates General and Consulates

Edinburgh
 Consulate-General of Brazil in Edinburgh
 Consulate General of China in Edinburgh 
 Consulate General of France in Edinburgh
 Consulate General of Germany in Edinburgh
 Consulate General of India in Edinburgh
 Consulate General of Ireland in Edinburgh
 Consulate General of Italy in Edinburgh
 Consulate General of Japan in Edinburgh
 Consulate General of Poland in Edinburgh
 Consulate General of Romania in Edinburgh
 Consulate General of Russia in Edinburgh
 Consulate General of Spain in Edinburgh
 Consulate General of Turkey in Edinburgh
 Consulate of Ukraine in Edinburgh
 Consulate General of the United States in Edinburgh

Glasgow
 Consulate General of Pakistan in Glasgow

Honorary Consulates

Aberdeen

 Honorary Vice-Consulate of Denmark in Aberdeen
 Honorary Consulate of Estonia in Aberdeen
 Honorary Consulate of France in Aberdeen
 Honorary Consulate of the Federal Republic of Germany in Aberdeen
 Honorary Consulate of Iceland in Aberdeen
 Honorary Consulate of Italy in Aberdeen
 Honorary Consulate of the Netherlands in Aberdeen
 Honorary Consulate of Norway in Aberdeen
 Honorary Consulate of Romania in Aberdeen
 Honorary Consulate of Spain in Aberdeen

Cupar
 Honorary Consulate of Croatia in Fife

Dundee
 Honorary Vice-Consulate of Denmark in Dundee
 Honorary Consulate of Norway in Aberdeen

Dunblane
 Honorary Vice-Consulate of Cyprus in Dunblane

Edinburgh

 Honorary Consulate of Austria in Edinburgh
 Honorary Consulate of Belgium in Edinburgh
 Honorary Consulate of Brazil in Edinburgh
 Honorary Consulate of Canada in Edinburgh
 Honorary Consulate of the Czech Republic in Edinburgh
 Honorary Consulate of Denmark in Edinburgh
 Honorary Consulate of Estonia in Edinburgh
 Honorary Consulate of Finland in Edinburgh, Glasgow and Aberdeen
 Honorary Consulate of France in Glasgow
 Honorary Consulate General of Greece in Edinburgh
 Honorary Consulate of Iceland in Edinburgh
 Honorary Consulate of Jamaica in Edinburgh
 Honorary Consulate of the Republic of Korea in Edinburgh
 Honorary Consulate of Lithuania in Edinburgh
 Honorary Consulate of Luxembourg in Edinburgh
 Honorary Consulate of Latvia in Edinburgh
 Honorary Consulate of Monaco in Edinburgh
 Honorary Consulate of Malawi in Edinburgh
 Honorary Consulate of Mauritius in Edinburgh
 Honorary Consulate of Namibia in Edinburgh
 Honorary Consulate of the Netherlands in Edinburgh
 Honorary Consulate of New Zealand in Edinburgh
 Honorary Consulate of Norway in Edinburgh
 Honorary Consulate of Portugal in Edinburgh
 Honorary Consulate of Sri Lanka in Edinburgh
 Honorary Consulate of Sweden in Edinburgh
 Honorary Consulate General of Switzerland in Edinburgh

Glasgow

 Honorary Consulate of Brazil in Glasgow
 Honorary Consulate of Chile in Glasgow
 Honorary Consulate of Cyprus in Glasgow
 Honorary Consulate of Denmark in Glasgow
 Honorary Consulate of the Federal Republic of Germany in Glasgow
 Honorary Consulate of Greece in Glasgow
 Honorary Consulate of Iceland in Glasgow
 Honorary Consulate of Italy in Glasgow
 Honorary Consulate of Latvia in Glasgow
 Honorary Consulate of Mexico in Glasgow
 Honorary Consulate of Mongolia in Glasgow
 Honorary Consulate of Norway in Glasgow
 Honorary Consulate of Romania in Glasgow
 Honorary Consulate of Rwanda in Kilsyth
 Honorary Consulate of Slovakia in Glasgow
 Honorary Consulate of Spain in Glasgow
 Honorary Consulate of Sweden in Glasgow
 Honorary Consulate of Thailand in Glasgow

Inverness
 Honorary Consulate of Romania in Inverness

Kirkwall
 Honorary Consulate of Norway in Kirkwall

Lerwick
 Honorary Consulate of France in Lerwick
 Honorary Consulate of the Federal Republic of Germany in Lerwick
 Honorary Consulate of Sweden in Lerwick

Stirlingshire
 Honorary Consulate of Malta in Stirlingshire

Stornoway
 Honorary Vice-Consulate of Denmark in Stornoway
 Honorary Consulate of France in Stornoway

Other Missions
 (Representative office)

See also
 Foreign relations of the United Kingdom
 List of diplomatic missions of the United Kingdom

References

External links
 LIST OF CONSULATES AND CONSULATES GENERAL WITHIN THE UNITED KINGDOM
 LIST OF HONORARY CONSULATES WITHIN THE UNITED KINGDOM, BRITISH OVERSEAS TERRITORIES AND CROWN DEPENDENCIES
 Consular Corps in Edinburgh & Leith (CCEL) this source is uncertain! this source lacks proper up-to-date information! useless!
 Consular Representatives in the UK this source lacks proper up-to-date information! useless!
 German Embassy London list of Honorary Consuls

 
Scotland
Consular
Consular missions